The GSh-18 (Cyrillic: ГШ-18) is a 9 mm semi-automatic pistol developed by the KBP Instrument Design Bureau in Tula during the 1990s. The pistol's name is derived from its designers—Gryazev and Shipunov—and its magazine capacity of 18 rounds.

History
The GSh-18 entered service in 2000 with the Russian Ministry of Justice. It was only in 2003 that the pistol was widely adopted under Decree of the Government of the Russian Federation No. 166.

Design details
The GSh-18 is a rotating-barrel, short recoil, locked-breech pistol with 10 locking lugs spaced equally around the barrel, the large locking surface area resulting in a strong lockup, making it suitable for high-velocity ammunition loads. The GSh-18 may be employed using standard 9×19mm Parabellum rounds, but was designed for the high velocity, Russian armour-piercing 9×19mm 7N31 round. The pistol incorporates a pre-set striker. The slide and working parts are steel, and the weapon has a polymer frame.

Two different designs of grip have been observed. The magazine capacity is 18 rounds, and an additional round may be carried in the chamber. The magazine release is reversible for left-handed shooters and the ejector doubles as a loaded chamber indicator. The magazines are a double stack, double feed design common to Russian military handguns.

Ammunition 
The GSh-18 is designed to fire standard 9×19mm Parabellum as well as the Russian 9×19mm 7N21 (Cyrillic: 7Н21) and 7N31 (Cyrillic: 7Н31) +P+ armor-piercing rounds. The 7N31, has demonstrated penetration of 8 mm of steel (15–20 meters of distance).

Variants 
 GSh-18 (GRAU index 6P54)
 GSh-18 Tactical with Picatinny rail, a new receiver and an ability to install a silencer, which was officially revealed in 2012.
 GSh-18S «Sport» (ГШ-18С «Спорт») – civilian version with modified trigger and firing pin and 10-round detachable box magazine
 GSh-18 «Sport 2» (ГШ-18 «Спорт 2») – civilian version with modified trigger and 18-round detachable box magazine
 GSh-18T (ГШ-18Т) – Non-lethal version using MP-80-13т .45 rubber bullets.

Users 
 
 Armed Forces of the Russian Federation
 Internal Troops
 Ministry of Justice
 Ministry of Internal Affairs
 Law enforcement in Russia
 
 Syrian Armed Forces
 Law enforcement in Syria

See also
MR-443 Grach (PYa)
Lebedev pistol

References

Sources 
 Михаил Дегтярев. Правнук «Токарева» // журнал «Калашников. Оружие. Боеприпасы. Снаряжение», No. 1, 2001 г. стр.10-18
 9-миллиметровый пистолет ГШ-18 // журнал «Солдат удачи», No. 5 (80), 2001. стр.24-25
 9х19 мм пистолет ГШ-18. Руководство по эксплуатации

External links

KBP Instrument Design Bureau—official site

9mm Parabellum semi-automatic pistols
Semi-automatic pistols of Russia
KBP Instrument Design Bureau products